Wu Ming-ming is a Taiwanese academic and politician who served on the Legislative Yuan from 2006 to 2008.

Career
Wu earned a bachelor's and master's degree at National Chung Hsing University, and obtained a Ph.D in agricultural economics and rural sociology from Ohio State University. He returned to Taiwan and taught marketing at NCHU, as part of an academic career that spanned three decades. Wu was also active in the Taiwan Agricultural Academia-Industry Alliance. He took office as an alternate legislator-at large on 27 January 2006. As a lawmaker, Wu took an interest in Chinese violations of Taiwanese trademarks, and expressed concern about the quality of hairy crabs imported from China. He advocated for the end of a ban on the use of ractopamine in July 2007, but stated in August that restrictions on the feed additive should not be removed. After stepping down from the legislature in 2008, Wu became an honorary professor at NCHU. In a 2010 editorial published in the Taipei Times, Wu argued against signing the Economic Cooperation Framework Agreement with China. He later joined the faculty of Kainan University. Wu was found not guilty of subornation of perjury and corruption in 2013, and filed a counter lawsuit against Ministry of Justice investigators.

References

Living people
Party List Members of the Legislative Yuan
Democratic Progressive Party Members of the Legislative Yuan
Members of the 6th Legislative Yuan
Academic staff of the National Chung Hsing University
National Chung Hsing University alumni
Ohio State University College of Food, Agricultural, and Environmental Sciences alumni
Year of birth missing (living people)